NAICS sector 11 (abbreviated to NAICS 11) is a sub-classification of economic activity that covers agriculture, forestry, fishing and hunting in the North American Industry Classification System (NAICS) system in Canada, the United States and Mexico.

The Agriculture, Forestry, Fishing and Hunting sector comprises establishments primarily engaged in growing crops, raising animals, harvesting timber, and harvesting fish and other animals from a farm, ranch, or their natural habitats.

The establishments in this sector are often described as farms, ranches, dairies, greenhouses, nurseries, orchards, or hatcheries. A farm may consist of a single tract of land or a number of separate tracts which may be held under different tenures. For example, one tract may be owned by the farm operator and another rented. It may be operated by the operator alone or with the assistance of members of the household or hired employees, or it may be operated by a partnership, corporation, or other type of organization. When a landowner has one or more tenants, renters, croppers, or managers, the land operated by each is considered a farm.

The sector distinguishes two basic activities: agricultural production and agricultural support activities. Agricultural production includes establishments performing the complete farm or ranch operation, such as farm owner-operators, tenant farm operators, and sharecroppers. Agricultural support activities include establishments that perform one or more activities associated with farm operation, such as soil preparation, planting, harvesting, and management, on a contract or fee basis.

Excluded from the Agriculture, Forestry, Hunting and Fishing sector are establishments primarily engaged in agricultural research and establishments primarily engaged in administering programs for regulating and conserving land, mineral, wildlife, and forest use. These establishments are classified in Industry 54171, Research and Development in the Physical, Engineering, and Life Sciences; and Industry 92412, Administration of Conservation Programs, respectively.

Sector 11 Codes
The values for NAICS codes beginning with 11 are summarized below.

11	Agriculture, Forestry, Fishing and Hunting
111	Crop Production
1111	Oilseed and Grain Farming
1112	Vegetable and Melon Farming
1113	Fruit and Tree Nut Farming
1114	Greenhouse, Nursery, and Floriculture Production
1119	Other Crop Farming
112	Animal Production
1121	Cattle Ranching and Farming
1122	Hog and Pig Farming
1123	Poultry and Egg Production
1124	Sheep and Goat Farming
1125	Animal Aquaculture
1129	Other Animal Production
113	Forestry and Logging
1131	Timber Tract Operations
1132	Forest Nurseries and Gathering of Forest Products
1133	Logging
114	Fishing, Hunting and Trapping
1141	Fishing
1142	Hunting and Trapping
115	Support Activities for Agriculture and Forestry
1151	Support Activities for Crop Production
1152	Support Activities for Animal Production
1153	Support Activities for Forestry

Industry classifications
Agriculture in North America
Forestry in North America
Fishing in North America
Hunting